Alfred Bobson Bawling (born 21 September 1995) is a semi-professional footballer who plays for Hendon as a midfielder.

Club career
After competing in athletics at county level, Bawling decided to take up football and joined the Watford academy at a young age after being released by Chelsea in 2008. Bawling progressed through the youth set-up, and signed a two-year scholarship in 2012. and as part of his development moved to Wealdstone on a one-month work experience loan in December 2013 where he made a handful of appearances. Upon the expiration of his contract, Bawling was released by Watford at the end of the 2013–14 season.

After leaving Watford, Bawling went on trial at League One side Crawley Town in the summer of 2014 and later signed a one-year deal at the club. He made his professional debut as a half-time substitute in their 1–0 win at Barnsley on 9 August 2014. Three days later, Bawling made his first start for Crawley in their League Cup tie against Ipswich Town, featuring for 63 minutes before being replaced by Ryan Dickson in their 1–0 victory. On 30 May 2017, it was announced that Bawling would leave Crawley upon the expiry of his contract in June 2017.

On 31 May 2017, it was announced that Bawling had signed for Woking of the National League for the 2017–18 season. On 5 August 2017, Bawling made his Woking debut during their 2–1 home victory over Gateshead, featuring for 70 minutes before being replaced by Jamie Philpot. On 28 August 2017, during Woking's 4–1 victory over Torquay United, Bawling scored his first ever professional goal, placing his effort into the top right hand corner past goalkeeper, Dan Lavercombe.

On 16 May 2018, it was announced that Bawling would join National League South side Torquay United, following his release from Woking. Shortly into 2018/19, on 5 October 2018, Bawling joined Oxford City on a one-month loan, making an instant impact by scoring against Dartford on his debut. The move was made permanent in November 2018.

Bawling joined St Albans City in the summer 2019 but left the club again on 12 October 2019 to join Enfield Town.

Following a two-year spell with Haringey Borough, Bawling joined Hendon in July 2022.

Career statistics

References

External links

1995 births
Living people
Footballers from Islington (district)
English footballers
Association football midfielders
Watford F.C. players
Wealdstone F.C. players
Crawley Town F.C. players
Woking F.C. players
Torquay United F.C. players
Oxford City F.C. players
St Albans City F.C. players
Enfield Town F.C. players
Haringey Borough F.C. players
Hendon F.C. players
Isthmian League players
English Football League players
National League (English football) players